Kita-Jūhachi-Jō Station (北18条駅) is a Sapporo Municipal Subway station in Kita-ku, Sapporo, Hokkaido, Japan. The station number is N04.

Platforms

Surrounding area
 Japan National Route 5, (to Hakodate)
 Kita Ward Central district
 Higashi Police Station
 Hokkaido University, School of veterinary medicine
 Fuji Women's University, Kita-Jūroku-Jō

References

External links

 Sapporo Subway Stations

 

Railway stations in Japan opened in 1971
Railway stations in Sapporo
Sapporo Municipal Subway
Kita-ku, Sapporo